Captain Sir Thomas Liddell, 1st Baronet (1578–1652) was an English politician, a member of the Liddell family which monopolized the local government of the North of England during the 16th and 17th centuries. He was one of the leading supporters of the Royalist cause in the English Civil War.

Family
Liddell was born in 1578, the son of Thomas Liddell (d.1619) and his wife Margaret Watson, daughter of John Watson, Alderman of Newcastle.

His paternal grandfather, Thomas Liddell of Newcastle-upon-Tyne (d.1577) was a merchant adventurer who had served as Sheriff of Newcastle in 1563-64 and Mayor of Newcastle in 1572–3. His father, Thomas (d.1619), also a merchant, made vast profits from corn and coal and bought Ravensworth Castle in 1607 and also served as Sheriff of Newcastle in 1592-93 and Mayor of Newcastle in 1597 and 1609.

Politics and the Civil War

A Catholic Recusant, he succeeded to Ravensworth Castle in 1615 on the death of his father. He also owned the Redheugh estate in County Durham. He was admitted to Gray's Inn on 15 March 1620.

Liddell served as Sheriff of Newcastle in 1609 and Mayor in 1625, 1634, and 1636.

In April 1640, he  was elected Member of Parliament for Newcastle-upon-Tyne in the Short Parliament. He was created a baronet on 2 November 1642.

After serving as a Trained band captain, Liddell was commissioned into the Royalist army in August 1642 and served as a Commissioner of Array. He smuggled arms to the Royalist party throughout the Civil War and attempted to disenfranchise Parliamentarian sympathizers amongst the aldermen and merchants of Newcastle. He fought at the Battle of Edgehill, for which he supplied horses to the Cavaliers and was in the Royalist garrison at Newcastle during the Siege of Newcastle by the Parliamentarians and wrote the defiant replies that the Parliamentarian authorities received in reply to their demands for the Royalists to surrender. However, the Royalist garrison was defeated in 1644 and Liddell was taken prisoner by the Parliamentarians and, in London in 1646, fined £4,000 as 'one of the most notorious delinquents in the country'. He was released in 1646 on the condition that he pay a fine. In 1652, he unsuccessfully attempted to convince the Parliamentarian government that he had paid the fine to Sir Arthur Haslerig when he had not. He died later that year.

Issue
In 1596, Liddell married Isabel Anderson, daughter of Henry Anderson of Haswell and had 14 children, most of whom predeceased him. His eldest son, Thomas, predeceased him and he was therefore succeeded in the baronetcy by his grandson Sir Thomas Liddell, 2nd Baronet who was a Colonel of Foot for the Parliamentarian regime in 1659. and married a daughter of Parliamentarian Sir Henry Vane the Younger.

Sir Francis Liddell (1607–1680)
The second son of Sir Thomas, Francis, was a Major in the Royalist army during the English Civil War. Francis was knighted by Charles I in 1643 and styled Sir Francis Liddell of Bamburgh Castle and Redheugh. Sir Francis gave evidence against the future regicide John Blakiston in 1636 and served as Sheriff of Newcastle in 1640. A Cavalier like his father, he was fined after the defeat of the Royalist cause in 1649. After the Restoration of the monarchy, he served as Governor of the Hostmen in 1665 and Mayor of Newcastle in 1666.

Sir Francis married firstly Elizabeth Tonge (d.1643), daughter of Sir George Tonge (d.1639) of Thickley and Denton, County Durham, who was the great-grandson of Henry Clifford, 10th Baron de Clifford. Sir Francis and Elizabeth Tonge had 11 children, including Francis Liddell (b.1633 - 1702) of Redheugh and later of Ogle Castle. Sir Francis (b.1607) married secondly, as her third husband, Agnes Chaytor (d.1669), daughter of Sir William Chaytor of Croft (d.1640). Agnes Chaytor had previously been married twice, first to Nicholas Forster (d.1636) of Bamburgh Castle, and second to a man surnamed Dawson, of Ripon. A son of Agnes Chaytor/Forster by Sir Francis Liddell (b.1607) called Francis (b.1633) married the daughter of Agnes Chaytor by Nicholas Forster, Frances or Francisca (d.1675). Sir Francis and Agnes Chaytor also had a daughter, Agnes Mary, who married Rev. Edward Fenwick, Vicar of Stamfordham, Northumberland, grandson of Sir William Fenwick of Wallington.

References

1578 births
1650 deaths
English MPs 1640 (April)
Cavaliers
Baronets in the Baronetage of England
Mayors of Newcastle upon Tyne
Liddell family